David Brickett (born 9 December 1950) is a South African cricketer. He played in 106 first-class and 48 List A matches for Eastern Province from 1971/72 to 1984/85.

See also
 List of Eastern Province representative cricketers

References

External links
 

1950 births
Living people
South African cricketers
Eastern Province cricketers
Cricketers from Port Elizabeth